The Oguta kingdom was established in like manners to the Benin Kingdom of Nigeria. Many people in Oguta believe that the Oguta people migrated from the ancient Benin Kingdom. They argue that the administrative set up, titles and common names have similarities to those of Bini people. Although the people of Oguta do not call their king Oba as the Bini do, both kingdoms have some striking parallels. The Binis have Iyase, in Oguta it is called Iyasara, there is Ogine among the Bini and Ogana in Oguta. Palm oil and plantain are called ofigbo and ipa in both Edo language and Oguta dialect to this day. Although the Oguta people speak a dialect of the Igbo language, some of their words are unmistakably of Bini origin.

The traditional ruler of Oguta, actually Ugwunta meaning, Little Hill is the Eze-igwe. He governs through a council of ministers called Oririnzere, chief of which is the Ogana or the Speaker.

History of Nigeria